The 1977 Chicago Bears season was their 58th regular season completed in the National Football League. The team finished with a 9–5 record, which was their first winning season since 1967 and earned them a wild card spot against the Dallas Cowboys, who eventually beat the Bears en route to a Super Bowl victory. This was their first postseason appearance since winning the 1963 championship. They secured this by winning their last six games, including among others the last of the Tampa Bay Buccaneers’ record run of twenty-six losses.

Star halfback Walter Payton had the best season of his career as he led the entire NFL in rushing (1,852 yards), 275 of those 1,852 came on a November 20 game against their division rivals the Minnesota Vikings and he did it despite coming down with the flu on a dark rainy day at Soldier Field.

A week after the Dallas playoff loss, Coach Pardee stunned the team by resigning to take the head coaching position of the Washington Redskins (George Allen having been fired after the Redskins were eliminated from the playoffs by a Bears overtime victory over the New York Giants in the last game of the regular season).

Offseason

NFL Draft

Roster

Regular season

Schedule

Playoffs

Game summaries

Week 1

Week 2
TV Station: CBS
TV Announcers: Frank Glieber, Johnny Morris
Jim Hart completed 12 straight passes, one of 10 yards for a second-quarter touchdown, while directing St. Louis to victory over Chicago 16-13. The veteran Hart who completed 16 of 24 passes while suffering two interceptions, contributed balance to  a crisp Cards attack and Jim Bakken booted three field goals.

Week 3
TV Station: CBS
TV Announcers: Don Criqui, Emerson Boozer
Archie Manning scored on runs of 8, 2 and 11 and threw a 35-yard Touchdown pass to Chuck Muncie as the Saints gain a road victory. The Saints also got TDs on a 52-yard fumble recovery by Bob Pollard and a 57-yard interception return by Jim Merlo.

Week 4

Week 6
Soldier Field in Chicago, Illinois
TV Station: CBS
Announcers: Vin Scully, Alex Hawkins
With about two minutes to go, Chicago appeared to have a one point victory over Atlanta. But the Bears' Steve Schubert fumbled a punt deep in his own territory, Atlanta recovered and Haskel Stanback plowed in moments later from the two-yard line for the Falcons victory. Chicago had taken a 3-0 lead on Bob Thomas' 40-yard field goal, but Nick Mike-Mayer come back with shots of 32 ,44, and 21 yards to put Atlanta ahead 9-3. Brian Baschnagel's 84-yard kickoff return resulted in the Bears only touchdown.

Week 7
Lambeau Field in Green Bay, Wisconsin
TV Station: CBS
Announcers: Gary Bender and Johnny Morris
Walter Payton's 205 tied Gale Sayers record for most rushing yards in a game that was set in 1968. "I didn't want to break Sayers' record because Sayers is a super guy. What's a record? I just want to win the game" Payton said it after scoring touchdown runs of 1 and 6 and setting up Johnny Musso's 3-yard touchdown run in a rout over the Packers.

Week 8
The Astrodome in Houston, Texas
TV Station: CBS
Announcers: Frank Glieber and Johnny Morris
Houston's big play offense, dormant throughout the season sprang to life on touchdown bombs of 85 and 43 yards to Ken Burrough and a 75-yard free kick return and a 61-yard touchdown run by Billy Johnson as the Oilers dazzled Chicago 47-0. Houston's first two big plays, Johnson's run and Burrough's 85-yarder we're delivered over a span of 2:55 in the second quarter and helped the Oilers to a 17-0 halftime lead and never looked back. Coach Jack Pardee call the loss "The worst thing i've ever been associated with in any form". This loss turns out to be a turning point in the Bears season. They would not lose a game again in the 1977 regular season.

Week 10

Week 11

    
    
    
    
    
    
    

Walter Payton 20 Rush, 137 Yds, 4 Rec, 107 Yds

Standings

Postseason

NFC Divisional Playoff

Safety Charlie Waters led the Cowboys to a 37–7 victory by setting an NFL playoff record of 3 interceptions. Dallas built a 17–0 halftime lead, with the aid of running back Doug Dennison’s 2-yard touchdown run and quarterback Roger Staubach’s 28-yard scoring pass to tight end Billy Joe Dupree. In the second half, running back Tony Dorsett recorded two rushing touchdowns and Efren Herrera added two more field goals. The Bears were limited to 224 total yards and did not score until the fourth quarter when the game was already out of reach.

Awards and records
 Walter Payton, NFL MVP
 Walter Payton, led NFL in rushing (1,852 yards) 
 Walter Payton, Pro Bowl Most Valuable Player
Walter Payton, Led NFL in Total Yards, (2,216)

References

External links
 Chicago Bears on Pro Football Reference
 Chicago Bears on jt-sw

Chicago Bears
Chicago Bears seasons
Chicago Bears